Clarendon is a suburb of Sydney, in the state of New South Wales, Australia.

Clarendon railway station is on the Richmond branch of the North Shore & Western Line of the Sydney Trains network.

It is also home to Hawkesbury Racecourse and the Hawkesbury Show Ground.

It borders the RAAF Base Richmond, a Royal Australian Air Force base at Richmond which was established in 1923. The air base is currently the home to the RAAF's transport squadrons. During the Vietnam War logistic support and medical evacuations were supplied by the Hercules from RAAF Richmond.

References

Suburbs of Sydney
City of Hawkesbury